Nova Esperança may refer to:

Nova Esperança, Paraná
Nova Esperança do Sul, a municipality in the state Rio Grande do Sul, Brazil
Nova Esperança do Piriá
Nova Esperança (Uíge), a town and commune in Angola
Nova Esperança, Belas, Luanda, Angola
Centro Esportivo Nova Esperança, a football team in Campo Grande, Brasil
New Hope (Macau), a political party in the Chinese Special Administrative Region of Macau